The 1974 season was the Hawthorn Football Club's 50th season in the Victorian Football League and 73rd overall.

Fixture

Premiership season

Finals Series

Ladder

References

Hawthorn Football Club seasons